Vascular endothelial zinc finger 1 is a protein that in humans is encoded by the VEZF1 gene.

Function

Transcriptional regulatory proteins containing tandemly repeated zinc finger domains are thought to be involved in both normal and abnormal cellular proliferation and differentiation. ZNF161 is a C2H2-type zinc finger protein (Koyano-Nakagawa et al., 1994 [PubMed 8035792]). See MIM 603971 for general information on zinc finger proteins.

References

Further reading